Sir Thomas Berry (died 1698), of Burrough, Northam, Devon, was an English politician.

He was a Member (MP) of the Parliament of England for Totnes in 1673.

References

Year of birth missing
1698 deaths
English MPs 1661–1679
Members of the Parliament of England (pre-1707) for Totnes